Antimicrobial peptides are short peptides that possess antimicrobial properties. The female reproductive tract and its tissues produce antimicrobial peptides as part of the immune response. These peptides are able to fight pathogens and at the same time allow the maintenance of the microbiota that are part of the reproductive system in women.

Defensins
 alpha-Defensins
 beta-Defensins
 theta-defensins
 Cathelicidins
 LL-37
 Whey acid proteins
 SLPI
 Elafin
 HE-4
 Lysozyme
 S100 proteins
Calpotectin
Psoriasin (S100A7)
 C-type lectins
SP-A
SP-D
Iron metabolism proteins
Lactoferrin
 Kinocidins
CCL20/Mip-3-alpha

External links
 Defensins Database, Singapore
 Innate ( Nonspecific ) Immunity at Western Kentucky University

References

 
Immunology
Immune system
Peripheral membrane proteins
Medical lists